The Taiwan People's Party is a political party in Taiwan, formally established on 6 August 2019 by Ko Wen-je, who serves as its first and current chairman.

Application process
The party was proposed in August 2019 by Mayor of Taipei Ko Wen-je, for the Ministry of the Interior's approval as one of Taiwan's legal political parties. It is named after Japanese Taiwan era political activist Chiang Wei-shui's Taiwanese People's Party, which was formed in 1927 as Taiwan's first political party. The newly formed Taiwan People's Party conducted its founding assembly on 6 August 2019, which was Ko’s 60th birthday and Chiang's 129th birthday, as a requirement of the Interior Ministry. According to Ko, the Taiwan People's Party seeks to "become an alternative" to both the Pan-Green Coalition headed by the Democratic Progressive Party, as well as the Kuomintang-influenced Pan-Blue Coalition.

Chiang Li-jung, a descendant of Chiang Wei-shui's, stated that Ko was taking advantage of similarities between himself and Chiang Wei-shui. The Chiang Wei-shui Cultural Foundation panned the name of Ko's political party, stating that confusion may arise between it and Chiang's political activity. In response, Ko stated that he preferred to retain the name, as establishing a political party was not an illegal act and therefore should not be hindered in any way. On 2 August 2019, Tseng Hsu-cheng, a former deputy mayor of Tainan, began a petition against the registration of the TPP under that name, citing the historical impact of the earlier Taiwanese People's Party.

Founding
At a preliminary meeting on 6 August 2019, Ko was elected chairman of the party. The founding assembly of the Taiwan People's Party was held at the National Taiwan University Hospital International Convention Center later that day. Of 111 founding party members, 72 attended its founding assembly. The Taiwan People's Party charter permits party members to hold membership status in other political parties. Many early party members worked for the Taipei City Government or for Ko. Among the TPP's first members were politicians formerly affiliated with the Democratic Progressive Party and the Kuomintang, as well as a number of political independents.

The party charter also states that the party's formal abbreviated name in Chinese is 民眾黨; Mínzhòngdǎng. Prior to the party's founding, Chinese-language media referred to the party as 台民黨; Táimíndǎng. The party colors are turquoise and white. The first signifies an end to the longtime blue–green political divide in Taiwan. The color white represents the "white force" of Ko's allies, a group that supports open and transparent government.

In 2023, the New Homeland Think Tank Association, was established as a TPP-affiliated think tank.

2020 elections
Ko stated that his Taiwan People's Party would contest the 2020 Taiwan legislative election, but that he would not mount an independent bid in the 2020 Taiwan presidential election. He later said that the TPP would nominate a full slate of 34 at-large legislative candidates. Political scientist Liao Da-chi opined that Ko's Taiwan People's Party would take more votes from supporters of the Democratic Progressive Party during the 2020 elections. The Taiwan People's Party nominated its first eight candidates for single-member constituencies on 22 September 2019. During a second round of legislative nominations on 20 October 2019, Ko stated that the Taiwan People's Party sought to prevent a single political party from winning a legislative majority. The TPP described this tactic as "pushing the pan-blue and pan-green camps to the side to allow for the people to be in the center." In November 2019, the Taiwan People's Party announced a party list of 29 at-large legislative candidates. In December 2019, the TPP's political goals grew in scale, as Ko stated that the party aimed to be the largest represented in the Legislative Yuan. The TPP won five at-large seats in the 2020 legislative election, becoming the third largest party represented within the legislature.

2020 Kaohsiung mayoral by-election 

Wu Yi-jheng of the TPP also ran a candidate in the 2020 Kaohsiung mayoral by-election.  However, he finished with only 4.06% of the vote, a distant third to Chen Chi-mai of the DPP (70.03%) and Li Mei-jhen of the KMT (25.90%).

Election results

Legislative elections

Local elections

Notable members 
 Jang Chyi-lu, an economist
 Ann Kao, member of Legislative Yuan, mayor of Hsinchu
 Ko Wen-je, mayor of Taipei
 Tsai Pi-ru, chief of staff of Taipei, member of Legislative Yuan
 Tsai Ping-kun, deputy mayor of Taipei
 , former director-general of the National Immigration Agency, left the Kuomintang for the Taiwan People's Party on May 31, 2020.
 Cynthia Wu, Shin Kong Group heiress, member of Legislative Yuan
 , Kaohsiung city councillor and 2020 Kaohsiung mayoral by-election candidate

References

External links
 

 
2019 establishments in Taiwan
Centrist parties in Asia
Liberal parties in Asia
Political parties established in 2019
Political parties in Taiwan